Stop Islamisation of Denmark is a Danish anti-Islamic organisation founded in 2005. The group has been active in campaigning against the building of mosques in Denmark and has staged free speech demonstrations in relation to the Jyllands-Posten Muhammad cartoons controversy. In 2007 the group protested outside of the European Union headquarters . In 2013 the group protested discrimination against Jews. The group was founded by Danish anti-Islamic activist Anders Gravers Pedersen who influenced the counter-jihad movement.

See also

 Stop Islamisation of Norway
 Stop Islamization of America
 Stop Islamisation of Europe
 Islam in Denmark

References

External links
Official blog

2005 establishments in Denmark
Counter-jihad
Anti-Islam sentiment in Denmark
Organizations established in 2005